"Love Across the Ocean" (stylized as "love across the ocean") is Koda Kumi's fifth domestic solo single. It charted at No. 19 on Oricon and stayed on the charts for four weeks.

Information
love across the ocean is Japanese R&B singer-songwriter Kumi Koda's fifth domestic single. The single peaked at No. 19 on the Oricon Weekly charts and remained on the charts for four weeks. It became her first single released for her second studio album, Grow into One, which would be released the following year on March 19.

The title track was used in a television advertisement for Kanebo Cosmetics' TESUTIMO (カネボウ化粧品「テスティモ」 / Kaneobou Keshouhin "TESUTIMO"). The single's b-sides were a remix of So into You and the "single version" of The Meaning of Peace.

The version of The Meaning of Peace featured on the single was Kumi's solo and had a different instrumental than the version originally released with BoA for the Song Nation project. This version of the song was later placed on Kumi's first compilation album, Best ~first things~, as a bonus track.

The music video for love across the ocean was placed on the corresponding DVD, 7 Spirits.

Promotional advertisements
To help promote the song, love across the ocean was used in a commercial for the Kao Corporation's TESUTIMO under their Kanebo Cosmetics line.

Music video
The music video for love across the ocean carried a space-oriented theme, symbolizing how love can travel across the galaxy.

It begins with Kumi appearing to have landed on Earth and trying to get used to Earth's atmosphere. Throughout the video, the version of Kumi tries to get used to Earth's atmosphere as another incarnation of her dances in front of a Space Shuttle.

The music video was later released for purchase on her DVD 7 Spirits in March the following year.

Track listing

Oricon Chart history
 Peak position: #19
 Weeks in top 200: 4

Sales
 First week estimate: 10,070
 Total estimate: 22,100

Alternate versions
love across the ocean
love across the ocean: Found on the single (2002) and corresponding album Grow into One (2003)
love across the ocean [Instrumental]: Found on the single (2002)
love across the ocean [Caramel Pod Remix]: Found on Koda Kumi Driving Hit's 2 (2010)

References

 Avex Network (2005), Koda Kumi Official Web Site
 Oricon Style (2005), Ranking – Oricon Style

2002 singles
2002 songs
Koda Kumi songs
Songs written by Koda Kumi